The 2003–04 NBA season was the 76ers' 65th season, and their 55th in the National Basketball Association. During the offseason, the Sixers acquired All-Star forward Glenn Robinson from the Atlanta Hawks and rookie Kyle Korver, who was drafted by the New Jersey Nets in the 2003 NBA draft. After Larry Brown left to become head coach of the Detroit Pistons, the Sixers hired Randy Ayers as his replacement. However, at midseason, Ayers was fired after a 21–31 start, and interim head coach Chris Ford took over for the rest of the season. Superstar guard Allen Iverson had a rough year in which he had clashed with coaches and skipped a number of practices. Despite Iverson playing only 48 games due to injuries, he still was voted to start in the 2004 NBA All-Star Game. Robinson finished second on the team in scoring averaging 16.6 points per game, but played just 42 games due to ankle and elbow injuries.

The Sixers lost 15 more games than the previous season, finishing fifth in the Atlantic Division with a 33–49 record and missing the playoffs for the first time since 1998. Following the season, Eric Snow was traded to the Cleveland Cavaliers, Derrick Coleman was traded to the Detroit Pistons, and Ford was fired.

Key dates
 June 26: The 2003 NBA draft took place in New York City.
 July 1: The free agency period started.
 October 7: The Sixers pre-season started with a game against the Miami Heat.
 October 28: The Sixers season started with a game against the Miami Heat.

Offseason

Draft picks

Draft day transactions
The 76ers selected French point guard Paccelis Morlende with the 50th overall pick in the 2003 NBA draft. On draft day, the Sixers purchased Kyle Korver from the New Jersey Nets. They also traded Morlende to the Seattle SuperSonics for Willie Green. Green would play with the Sixers for seven seasons.

July
On July 16, the Sixers signed Amal McCaskill. McCaskill would play in more games with the Sixers than with all of his other previous NBA teams combined.
One week later, the Sixers were involved in a four-team trade with the New York Knicks, the Atlanta Hawks, and the Minnesota Timberwolves. The Sixers traded Keith Van Horn to the Knicks, as well as Randy Holcomb and a 2007 first-round draft pick to the Hawks. The Hawks did not receive the draft pick because it was lottery protected, so they received cash instead. The Hawks traded Glenn Robinson and a 2006 second-round draft pick to the Sixers. The Timberwolves traded Marc Jackson to Philadelphia. Robinson would start all of the games he played in for Philadelphia. Jackson would only play in 22 games with the 76ers.

August–October
On August 8, the Sixers waived Efthimios Rentzias.
On October 11, the Sixers waived William Avery.

Roster

Roster Notes
 Center Todd MacCulloch missed the entire season due to a foot injury.

Regular season

Record vs. opponents

Player statistics

Season

Awards and records

Transactions

References

See also
 2003–04 NBA season

Philadelphia 76ers seasons
Philadelphia
Philadelphia
Philadelphia